Estrella High School is a public charter high school in Avondale, Arizona. It is operated by The Leona Group. It is a member of the Canyon Athletic Association.

Public high schools in Arizona
The Leona Group
Charter schools in Arizona
Schools in Maricopa County, Arizona